Miraflores is the name of several places in Spanish-speaking countries. It means "behold the flowers" or "flowers view" from mirar ("to look at, to watch") and flores ("flowers").

Places
Caribbean
 Miraflores, Distrito Nacional, a sector in the city of Santo Domingo, Dominican Republic
 Miraflores, Añasco, Puerto Rico, a barrio
 Miraflores, Arecibo, Puerto Rico, a barrio
Europe
 Miraflores, a neighbourhood near Lisbon, Portugal
 Miraflores, a neighbourhood in Marbella, Spain
 Miraflores de la Sierra, a town and municipality in the Community of Madrid, Spain
 Miraflores, a neighbourhood and train station in Zaragoza, Spain
Mexico
 Miraflores, Baja California Sur, a town in the municipality of Los Cabos, Mexico
South America
 Miraflores, Catamarca, a village and municipality in Argentina
 Miraflores, Chaco, a village and municipality in Argentina
 Miraflores Private Neighborhood, in Garín, Greater Buenos Aires, Argentina
 Miraflores, La Paz, in Bolivia
 Miraflores (Chile), a residential suburb in Viña del Mar, Valparaíso Region, Chile
 Miraflores, Guaviare, a town and municipality in Colombia
 Miraflores, Boyacá, a town and municipality in Colombia
 Miraflores (Ecuador), a residential quarter in Ambato, Ecuador
 Miraflores, a city sector of Guayaquil, Ecuador
 Miraflores District, Lima, one of the 43 subdivisions of the city of Lima, Peru
United States
 Miraflores, California, a community inside of Anaheim
 Miraflores Park, Texas, the historic garden of Aureliano Urrutia that is now an annex of Brackenridge Park in San Antonio, Texas

Structures
Miraflores Charterhouse, a Carthusian monastery in Burgos, Spain
Miraflores (Panama), a lock in the Panama canal
Miraflores Palace, in Caracas, the official workplace of the President of Venezuela
Museo Miraflores, an archeological museum in Guatemala City

Other uses
Miraflores Altarpiece, a 15th-century triptych painted by Rogier van der Weyden
Battle of Miraflores, in the Miraflores District of Lima, Peru
CB Miraflores, a basketball club in Burgos, Spain

See also
Miraflores District (disambiguation)